Wa$ted! is a New Zealand reality television series which shows families their impact on the environment and helps them to become greener in their daily lives. The show has been acclaimed as the first show of its type. Even in production, they reduce their impact on the earth by using hybrid cars, crew carpooling, and reusing props.

The series spawned versions in 15 countries outside of New Zealand. Wa$ted was also produced as a television show most notably in the United States, and also in Canada, Spain, Denmark, Portugal, and Malaysia.

Format
Francesca and Tristan return the family's trash from the previous year at the beginning of the show. From there, they sort through the trash with the family to demonstrate what could have been recycled and the impact their trash is having on the environment. Taking into account rubbish, electricity, water, and transportation, an ecological footprint is calculated to show how much land it would take to provide the resources for their household. They also calculate how many tones of carbon dioxide the family would emit in a year, comparing it to the national average (in New Zealand its 2.5 tones per person per year).

Francesca and Tristan then help the family reduce their environmental impact. Recycling and food scrap systems are implemented and followed by dealing with heating, power consumption, water consumption, and transportation. This includes a section called Tristan's Test where Tristan tests their knowledge (usually the children) of what environment impact a simple task can do.

After completing the tasks of reducing the household impact, Francesca and Tristan leave for three weeks to watch how good the families are at using the new systems. They promise to project forward any savings the family makes in those three weeks for one year and give those savings back in cash. On their return, Francesca and Tristan reveal how much the family's household footprint and carbon dioxide emissions have been reduced. Francesca then opens a green bucket, containing the savings they would have produced over a year, and gives the cash to the family.

Differences in series 1
In series 1 the carbon dioxide emissions and Tristan's test were not used.

Episodes

Series 1

Series 2

Awards and nominations
Best Observational Format - FRAPA/C21 Format Awards 2007
Supreme Energywise & Residential Award - EECA 2007
Green Ribbon Award - MfE 2007
Best Innovation - Sustainable Business Network 2007

References

External links
 All3Media International, London - Distributor website

2007 New Zealand television series debuts
2008 New Zealand television series endings
English-language television shows
Environment of New Zealand
Environmental television
New Zealand reality television series
Television shows funded by NZ on Air
Television series by All3Media
Three (TV channel) original programming
Television series by South Pacific Pictures